Jaro Cathedral, formally known as Jaro Metropolitan Cathedral and the National Shrine of Our Lady of the Candles, is the seat of the Roman Catholic Archdiocese of Jaro. It is located in the district of Jaro in Iloilo City, Iloilo, on the island of Panay in the Philippines. It was placed under the patronage of Saint Elizabeth of Hungary. It was established on March 3, 1575 as a visita of Oton by the Augustinians and as a separate parish in 1587. The present-day structure of Jaro Cathedral was built in 1587.

The Catholic Bishops' Conference of the Philippines formally declared the cathedral the National Shrine of Our Lady of the Candles (Nuestra Señora de la Candelaria) in February 2012. The cathedral is the fourth national shrine in the Visayas and Mindanao, after the Basilica del Santo Niño in Cebu (1965), Mandaue Church (2001), and Virgen de la Regla Church in Lapu-Lapu City (2007). Likewise, it is also the second Marian dedicated declared "National Shrine" church or cathedral in Visayas and Mindanao (first National Shrine in Western Visayas).

The statue of Nuestra Señora de la Candelaria (Candelaria) perched atop the façade of the cathedral, is the first Marian image canonically crowned personal by a Pope and Saint (John Paul II) in the Philippines and Asia. Also, through the said canonical crowning, the Nuestra Señora de la Candelaria has been declared as the official Roman Catholic patron of Western Visayas and Romblon, and made known Jaro as the 'center of Candelaria devotion in the Philippine islands'.

History

Along with the boom of the sugar industry of the Philippines especially centered in Iloilo, several churches and schools are constructed in Jaro. The present cathedral structure was finished in 1874 by the first Bishop of Jaro, Mariano Cuartero, O.P. It was destroyed by the January 1948 Lady Caycay earthquake and later repaired in 1956 by the first Archbishop of Jaro, José María Cuenco.

The Marian image of Our Lady of the Candles also has the distinction of being canonically crowned personally by Pope John Paul II during his visit to Iloilo City on February 21, 1981, making it as the only Marian figure to be given such stature in the Philippines.

The journalist, national hero, and co-founder of the Propaganda Movement, Graciano López Jaena, was baptized in the cathedral on December 20, 1856.

The National Historical Institute of the Philippines declared the Jaro Cathedral an historical landmark in 1976.

In January 2012, the Catholic Bishops' Conference of the Philippines approved the cathedral as the National Shrine of Our Lady of the Candles, the second Marian-dedicated church or cathedral (1st National Shrine in Western Visayas) to receive such status in Visayas and Mindanao.

The current parish priest/cathedral rector is Msgr. Jose Marie Amado Delgado.

Architecture
The shrine is constructed in the Romanesque Revival style, deviating from semi-circular arches. A distinctive feature is that the bell tower, Jaro Belfry, is located across a busy street from the church, on Jaro Plaza, resembling Ilocos churches.  Typically, belfries are built next to their churches. In this case, the tower was adjacent to an earlier church, but an earthquake destroyed the church and left the tower.  Another distinctive feature is the stairs attached to the front façade of the cathedral, over the main entrance, leading up to a shrine featuring a statue of Our Lady of the Candles, as can be see in the picture at the top of this article. The church also possesses relics of St. Josemaría Escrivá.

Another feature of the church is its all-male ensemble of saints placed on the main pillars, with the exception of the Virgin's icon. The arrangement is in response to Molo Church's all-female theme.

On the cathedral grounds are several archdiocesan and parish offices, and a perpetual adoration chapel. About a block away is the archdiocesan seminary, St. Vincent Ferrer Seminary, and across the plaza is the archbishop's palace.

Famous events

 Our Lady of the Candles canonical crowning - During the apostolic visit of pope and saint John Paul II in 1981 in the Philippines, he crowned the statue of the Our Lady of Candles, the first and only marian image to receive such honor without a papal legate in the Philippines and Asia. Such event elevated the status of Candelaria as the patroness of Western Visayas and Jaro Cathedral as center of Candelaria devotion in the Philippine islands.
 Baptisms of notable people - national hero, journalist and propagandist Graciano Lopez Jaena who was born in Jaro was baptized in Jaro Cathedral. Ilongga senator Grace Poe, a foundling herself, was found and baptized in Jaro Cathedral.

Gallery

See also
 Jaro Belfry
 Crowned Marian images in the Philippines

References

External links

Official website
Archdiocese of Jaro on Catholic Bishops Conference of the Philippines online
Archdiocese of Jaro on the Catholic Encyclopedia
Archdiocese of Jaro on Catholic-Hierarchy.org

Roman Catholic cathedrals in the Philippines
Roman Catholic churches in Iloilo
Spanish Colonial architecture in the Philippines
Romanesque Revival church buildings in the Philippines
Buildings and structures in Iloilo City
Tourist attractions in Iloilo City
Roman Catholic national shrines in the Philippines
Churches in the Roman Catholic Archdiocese of Jaro